On September 24, 1893, anarchist Paulí Pallàs attempted to assassinate Catalonia Captain General Arsenio Martínez Campos during a military parade in Barcelona. The attackers' two bombs missed their target, only slightly injuring the general, but seriously injuring over a dozen others, leading to two deaths. The attacker, who did not attempt to flee, was arrested, sentenced to death, and executed two weeks later. In his trial, he said he sought to avenge the executions of the anarchists killed following the prior year's Jerez uprising. The attack on Martínez Campos precipitated a series of reprisals, culminating in the assassination of Spanish Prime Minister Cánovas del Castillo in 1897.

Bibliography 

 
 
 

1893 crimes in Spain
1893 in Spain
1890s in Catalonia
Anarchism in Spain
Martinez Campos, Arsenio